Andrei Dodi Joca (born 22 June 2000) is a Romanian professional footballer who plays as a right winger.

Honours
CFR Cluj
Liga I: 2019–20, 2020–21
Supercupa României: 2020

References

External links
 
 
 

2000 births
Living people
Sportspeople from Baia Mare
Romanian footballers
Association football midfielders
Liga I players
CFR Cluj players
Liga III players
CS Gloria Bistrița-Năsăud footballers